Primrose Cumming (1915–2004) was a British writer of children's books.

Her writing career spanned over 30 years, and produced some fine examples of the pony book genre, combining accurate observation of human and equine with a certain wry humour.  In her most sought-after title Silver Snaffles, Tattles is brilliantly observed:  by turns tetchy and patient, he is the archetypal family pony who has long-sufferingly taught generations of children to ride; in contrast, Smug, the evil pony in Silver Eagle Carries On has a mind strictly her own:  “Smug, of course, had no intention of jumping anything, but she held upon the right course until the last second, when she adroitly stepped to one side.”
  
Primrose Cumming was equally good at human characters: the Silver Eagle Riding School series has Josephine, the brilliant, but irritating middle sister, alternately a torment and an inspiration to her elder sister Mary. Tabby and Martin Mead in The Wednesday Pony dream their lives away wishing their pony Jingo was a show hack, a racehorse or simply a Dream Pony before realising that they would have to go a very long way before finding a better pony than the one they have.

Biography 
Primrose Cuming was the youngest of a family of two girls and a boy, and was born on the Isle of Thanet, Kent, in 1915 during the First World War.  She was educated by a governess, who recognised her flair for writing.  Her first story, about the travelling adventures of an ant, was published in Nursery World. She said:

The first book Primrose had published was Doney (Country Life 1934), which reflected her love of ponies.  She was, she said, 

The published dates of Primrose Cummings’ books make it likely that these were Spider Dog (1935), and perhaps Silver Snaffles, which presumably was accepted for publication by the time she was 21:  it was published in 1936, when she was 22.

Primrose Cumming still wrote during World War II, but also did war work, working for a year on a farm. One day a bomber crashed in the same field as the sheep she was looking after, but she survived, and her experience on the farm led directly to her book Owl's Castle Farm. Later she joined the Auxiliary Territorial Service and served for the remainder of the war in an anti-aircraft battery.  Between air-raids, she wrote The Great Horses.  This is the only one of her books of that period which is not set firmly in her own experience:  it is an historical fiction, tracing the experiences of a line of heavy horses over several centuries.

After the war, she had a temporary job as under-matron in a boys’ school.  This was not a success, as she saw the boys’ side rather more easily than the masters’.  She returned to her family home in East Sussex, and decided to stick to writing and gardening.  Horses were by no means her only interest:  she was an expert flower arranger, and exhibited at the local flower shows and the Chelsea Flower Show. The books she published in her later years were based less closely on her own experiences.  After parting company with J. M. Dent in the late 1960s, Primrose Cumming carried on writing for D. C. Thomson & Co., the magazine publishers, on many subjects and also contributed short stories to several editions of The Pony Club Annual.   She stopped writing in the 1960s, feeling that she was becoming out of touch with modern youth.  Primrose Cumming died in 2004.

None of her books are currently in print, but Fidra Books republished Silver Snaffles, which appeared in late 2007.

Bibliography

 Doney – a Borderland Tale of Ponies and Young People (Country Life, 1934, illustrated by Allen W Seaby)
 Spider Dog (Country Life, 1936, illustrated by Barbara Turner)
 Silver Snaffles (Blackie, 1937, illustrated by Stanley Lloyd)
 The Silver Eagle Riding School (A & C Black, 1938, illustrated by Cecil Trew)
 Rachel of Romney (Country Life, 1939, illustrated by Nina Scott-Langley)
 The Wednesday Pony (Blackie, 1939, illustrated by Stanley Lloyd)
 Ben: The Story of A Cart-Horse (Dent, 1939, illustrated with photographs by Harold Burdekin)
 The Chestnut Filly (Blackie, 1940, illustrated by Stanley Lloyd)
 Silver Eagle Carries On (A & C Black, 1940, illustrated by Cecil Trew)
 Owls Castle Farm (A & C Black, 1942, illustrated by Veronica Baker)
 The Great Horses (Dent, 1946, illustrated by Lionel Edwards)
 Trouble At Trimbles (Country Life, 1949, illustrated by Geoffrey Whittam)
 Four Rode Home (Dent, 1951, illustrated by Maurice Tulloch)
 Rivals To Silver Eagle (A & C Black, 1954, illustrated by Eve Gossett)
 No Place For Ponies (Dent, 1954, illustrated by Maurice Tulloch)
 The Deep-Sea Horse (Dent, 1956, illustrated by Mary Shillabeer)
 Flying Horseman (Dent, 1959, illustrated by Sheila Rose)
 The Mystery Trek (Dent, 1964, illustrated by Sheila Rose)
 Foal of the Fjords (Dent, 1966, illustrated by Wendy Marchant)
 Penny and Pegasus (Dent, 1969, illustrated by Mary Gernat)

Sources
The Fascinating Story of a Writer. .... Primrose Cumming – Growing Up, by Primrose Cumming in Judy, 1963
Folly Magazine, no 44, Spring 2005
Badger, J. Introduction in Silver Snaffles, by Primrose Cumming. Edinburgh: Fidra Books, 2007

Notes

External links
A website with a longer version of this article, and cover scans of most of her books
An article about collecting pony books: including Primrose Cummings'.  Its author worked for one of Primrose Cumming's publishers.
Fidra Books page about the author

English children's writers
1915 births
2004 deaths
Pony books
People from Thanet (district)